The Russian Athletics Federation (RAF), previously named the All-Russia Athletic Federation (ARAF), is the governing body for the sport of athletics in Russia. Its president is Dmitry Shlyakhtin.

World Athletics suspended the Russian Athletics Federation from World Athletics starting in 2015, for eight years, due to doping violations. However, Russian athletes were eligible to compete as Authorised Neutral Athletes (ANA). 

, due to the 2022 Russian invasion of Ukraine, World Athletics has banned all Russian athletes, support personnel, and officials from all World Athletics Series events for the foreseeable future, including those with ANA status.

Affiliations and associations 
The RAF is the national member federation for Russia in World Athletics and the European Athletic Association (EAA). Due to doping allegations, its participation in both organisations has been suspended since 2015.

National records 
The RAF maintains the Russian records in athletics.

Doping allegations and determinations

In December 2014, the German broadcaster ARD made wide-ranging allegations of doping in Russian athletics and high-level cover-ups of this. Alleging state involvement in systematic cheating, the documentary accused Russia of an "East German-style" doping programme. These resulted in then ARAF President Valentin Balakhnichev's resignation as Treasurer of the International Association of Athletics Federations (IAAF).

In response to this, the World Anti-Doping Agency (WADA) commissioned an investigation, the report of which was published on 9 November 2015. The 323-page document, described as "damning" by The Guardian, reported widespread doping and large-scale cover ups by the authorities. It recommended that ARAF be declared non-compliant with respect to the World Anti-Doping Code, and recommended that the International Olympic Committee not accept any entries from ARAF until compliance was reached. On 13 November, the IAAF council overwhelmingly voted 22–1 in favour of prohibiting Russia from world sports events with immediate effect. Under other penalties against the ARAF, Russia has been also prohibited from hosting the 2016 World Race Walking Team Championships (Cheboksary) and 2016 World Junior Championships (Kazan), and ARAF must entrust doping cases to Court of Arbitration for Sport.

ARAF accepted the indefinite IAAF suspension and did not request a hearing. ARAF's efforts towards regaining full IAAF membership will be monitored by a five-person IAAF team.

On June 21, 2016, the International Olympic Committee affirmed the decision by the International Association of Athletics Federations, banning all of the All-Russia Athletic Federation athletes from competing in 2016 Olympics.

In 2021, the Russian Athletic Federetion paid a fine of US$2,000,000 to World Athletics for infrenging the doping rules: this fine will be used to pay prize money to finalists of Oregon 2022 and Budapest 2023.

Invasion of Ukraine

, due to the 2022 Russian invasion of Ukraine, World Athletics has banned all Russian athletes, support personnel, and officials from all World Athletics Series events for the foreseeable future, including those with ANA status.

2016 Summer Olympics qualified athletes denied participation by IAAF 

 Men's 400 m – Pavel Ivashko
 Men's marathon – Aleksey Reunkov
 Men's 110 m hurdles – Sergey Shubenkov
 Men's 400 m hurdles – Denis Kudryavtsev, Timofey Chalyy, Ivan Shablyuyev
 Men's 3000m steeplechase – Ilgizar Safiullin
 Men's 20 km walk – Nikolay Markov
 Men's 50 km walk – Roman Evstifeev, Sergey Sharypov
 Men's 4x400 – Artem Denmukhametov, Pavel Ivashko, Ilya Krasnov, Vladimir Krasnov, Pavel Trenikhin
 Men's long jump – Vasiliy Kopeykin, Aleksandr Menkov, Sergey Polyanskiy
 Men's triple jump – Lyukman Adams,  Dmitriy Chizhikov,  Aleksey Fyodorov
 Men's high jump – Danil Lysenko, Ivan Ukhov, Daniil Tsyplakov
 Men's pole vault – Georgy Gorokhov
 Men's shot put – Maksim Sidorov, Aleksandr Lesnoy
 Men's discus throw – Viktor Butenko
 Men's hammer throw – Sergey Litvinov, Aleksiy Sokirskiy
 Men's javelin throw – Dmitriy Tarabin
 Men's decathlon – Ilya Shkurenyov
 Women's 400 m – Antonina Krivoshapka
 Women's 1500m – Elena Korobkina,  Anna Shchagina
 Women's 5000 m – Gulshat Fazlitdinova,  Elena Korobkina
 Women's 10000 m – Alla Kulyatina
 Women's 3000 m steeplechase – Ekaterina Sokolenko,  Natalya Vlasova
 Women's marathon – Tatyana Arkhipova, Alina Prokopyeva, Sardana Trofimova
 Women's 4 × 100 m – Elena Chernyaeva, Anna Kukushkina, Marina Panteleeva, Yevgeniya Polyakova, Kristina Sivkova
 Women's 4x400 – Kseniya Aksyonova, Antonina Krivoshapka, Alena Mamina, Yekaterina Renzhina
 Women's 100 m hurdles – Yekaterina Galitskaya
 Women's 400 m hurdles – Vera Rudakova
 Women's high jump – Mariya Kuchina
 Women's pole vault – Yelena Isinbayeva, Olga Mullina, Anzhelika Sidorova
 Women's long jump – Anna Misochenko, Yuliya Pidluzhnaya
 Women's triple jump – Yekaterina Koneva
 Women's shot put – Irina Tarasova
 Women's discus throw – Yelena Panova, Yekaterina Strokova, Yuliya Maltseva
 Women's hammer throw – Oksana Kondratyeva
 Women's javelin throw – Vera Rebrik
 Women's 20 km walk – Marina Pandakova, Mariya Ponomaryova, Svetlana Vasilyeva

Renaming
Renamed Russian Athletics Federation.

See also 
 Russia at the 2016 Summer Olympics
 Doping in Russia
 McLaren Report

References

External links 
 

Athletics in Russia
National governing bodies for athletics
Russia
Athletics